Chiniki Creek is a stream in Alberta, Canada.

Chiniki Creek has the name of Chief Chiniki, a Stoney tribal leader.

See also
List of rivers of Alberta

References

Rivers of Alberta